Leighton Station was a railway station on the Transperth network in Perth, Western Australia.

History
Along with the rest of the Fremantle line, Leighton closed on 1 September 1979 due to low passenger counts. It reopened in 1983 with the rest of the line following a change of government.

Services
Leighton station was served by Fremantle line services operated by Westrail on behalf of the Metropolitan Transport Trust from Fremantle to Perth.

Platforms
Leighton had two platforms on an island. Services towards Perth departed from platform 1.

References

External links

Fremantle line
Disused railway stations in Western Australia
Railway stations in Australia opened in 1922